The Old University of Alabama Observatory, now known as Frederick R. Maxwell Hall, was an astronomical observatory owned and operated by the University of Alabama in Tuscaloosa, Alabama.  Although no longer used as an observatory, the building has been restored and preserved.  It currently houses the university's Collaborative Arts Research Initiative (CARI), an interdisciplinary, arts-focused research engine driven by the interests of faculty from across the University. By facilitating collaborations across disciplines, CARI maximizes the impact of faculty arts research, while enriching the University, local, and regional communities.  Significant for its architectural and historical importance, it was added to the National Register of Historic Places on January 14, 1972.

History 

The Greek Revival-style observatory building was completed in 1844, though the equatorial mounted Troughton & Simms  refracting telescope was not mounted until 1849. The observation room was built with a large central section, capped by a revolving  diameter dome. At the west end of the building was a transit instrument room with a north-south slit in the roof. Opposite the transit room was an office. It used a  circle, readable to a single arc second.

The University of Alabama, converted to a military campus at the time, was largely destroyed during a Federal raid led by General John Croxton on April 4, 1865.  The observatory was one of seven buildings on campus that escaped being burned to the ground, although it suffered extensive damage.  The lens had been sent to nearby Bryce Hospital for safekeeping, although parts of the telescope were removed by some of the troops as trophies.  The other campus buildings to survive the event were the President's Mansion (1841), Gorgas House (1829), the Little Round House (1860), and a few faculty residences.

Though the observatory and instruments had been damaged in the raid, the telescopes and observatory were still usable for teaching purposes until the 1890s.  A new observatory was built in Gallalee Hall in 1949 and a new telescope was installed by 1950.  The old observatory building was known simply as the Old Observatory until 1985, when it was renamed in honor of Frederick R. Maxwell, a retired consulting engineer for the university who had been responsible for protecting and preserving the remnants of the 1800s university campus.  Following the renaming of the building it has been home to the Computer Based Honors Program and the university's Creative Campus program.  It currently houses the university's Collaborative Arts Research Initiative.

See also
University of Alabama Observatory
List of observatories
National Register of Historic Places listings in Tuscaloosa County, Alabama

References

External links
 

Astronomical observatories in Alabama
Greek Revival architecture in Alabama
University of Alabama
Infrastructure completed in 1844
National Register of Historic Places in Tuscaloosa County, Alabama
Buildings and structures in Tuscaloosa, Alabama
Historic American Buildings Survey in Alabama